Buckner Branch is a stream in Iron County in the U.S. state of Missouri.

Buckner Branch has the name of Lewis Buckner, an early settler.

See also
List of rivers of Missouri

References

Rivers of Iron County, Missouri
Rivers of Missouri